This article is about the particular significance of the year 1902 to Wales and its people.

Incumbents 

Archdruid of the National Eisteddfod of Wales – Hwfa Môn

Lord Lieutenant of Anglesey – Sir Richard Henry Williams-Bulkeley, 12th Baronet  
Lord Lieutenant of Brecknockshire – Joseph Bailey, 1st Baron Glanusk
Lord Lieutenant of Caernarvonshire – John Ernest Greaves
Lord Lieutenant of Cardiganshire – Herbert Davies-Evans
Lord Lieutenant of Carmarthenshire – Sir James Williams-Drummond, 4th Baronet
Lord Lieutenant of Denbighshire – William Cornwallis-West    
Lord Lieutenant of Flintshire – Hugh Robert Hughes 
Lord Lieutenant of Glamorgan – Robert Windsor-Clive, 1st Earl of Plymouth
Lord Lieutenant of Merionethshire – W. R. M. Wynne 
Lord Lieutenant of Monmouthshire – Godfrey Morgan, 1st Viscount Tredegar
Lord Lieutenant of Montgomeryshire – Sir Herbert Williams-Wynn, 7th Baronet 
Lord Lieutenant of Pembrokeshire – Frederick Campbell, 3rd Earl Cawdor
Lord Lieutenant of Radnorshire – Powlett Milbank

Bishop of Bangor – Watkin Williams 
Bishop of Llandaff – Richard Lewis
Bishop of St Asaph – A. G. Edwards (later Archbishop of Wales) 
Bishop of St Davids – John Owen

Events
4 March – Five miners are killed in a mining accident at Milfaen Colliery, Blaenavon.
1 May – Cardiff Corporation Tramways begins operating its electric system.
3 June – Six miners are killed in an accident at Gerwen Colliery, Llanelli.
26 June – In the 1902 Coronation Honours, Isambard Owen and Alfred Thomas receive knighthoods.
15 July – Francis Grenfell is created 1st Baron Grenfell of Kilvey in the County of Glamorgan.
31 July – Opening of the first section of the Great Orme Tramway at Llandudno, the longest funicular railway in the British Isles.
2 August – A. G. Edwards, Bishop of St Davids, is appointed Honorary Chaplain to the Denbighshire Yeomanry.
August – Opening of the Vale of Rheidol Railway for goods traffic (it opens to passengers on 22 December).
11 November – Five miners are killed in an accident at Deep Navigation Colliery, Mountain Ash.
date unknown
Alfred Mond founds his nickel works at Clydach in the Swansea Valley.
230 Welsh colonists leave Patagonia for Manitoba in Canada.
Opening of Caernarfon electric power station.

Arts and literature

Awards
National Eisteddfod of Wales – held in Bangor
Chair – T. Gwynn Jones
Crown – R. Silyn Roberts

New books

English language
Rhoda Broughton – Lavinia
Violet Jacob – The Sheep-stealers
Arthur Machen – Hieroglyphics
Allen Raine – A Welsh Witch

Welsh language
Hugh Brython Hughes – Tlysau Ynys Prydain
Thomas Rowland Roberts – Y Monwyson

Music
Sir Henry Walford Davies – Three Jovial Huntsmen

Sport
Gymnastics – The Welsh Amateur Gymnastics Association is formed.
Rugby union – Wales win the Home Nations Championship and take the Triple Crown.

Births
4 February – Tal Harris, Wales international rugby player (died 1963)
25 February – Wogan Philipps, 2nd Baron Milford, politician (died 1993)
4 March – David Evans-Bevan, industrialist (died 1973)
19 March – Dilys Cadwaladr, poet (died 1979)
16 April – Hugh Iorys Hughes, civil engineer (died 1977 in England)
22 April – Megan Lloyd George, politician (died 1966)
18 June – Morgan Phillips, politician (died 1963)
17 July – Nathan Rocyn-Jones, doctor, international rugby player and President of the WRU (died 1984)
2 September – Leslie Gilbert Illingworth, political cartoonist (died 1979)
21 September – E. E. Evans-Pritchard, anthropologist of Welsh descent (died 1972)
27 October (in Oxford) – Harold Arthur Harris, academic (died 1974)
26 November (in Wales or Bristol) – Cyril Bence, academic and politician (died 1992)
date unknown – Richard Bryn Williams, writer (died 1981)

Deaths
1 January – William McConnel, industrialist, 93  
11 January – James James, harpist and composer, 69
19 February – Jeremiah Jones, poet, 46
6 March – William Rathbone, politician, 82
11 March – Alcwyn Evans, historian, 73
6 April – Robert Owen, theologian, 81
5 June – Arthur Powell Davies, English-born American minister, author, and activist of Welsh parentage (d. 1957)
13 July – Edmund Hannay Watts, industrialist (Wattstown)
14 July – Martyn Jordan, Wales international rugby player, 37
23 August – Robert Henry Davies, colonial official in British India, 78
5 October – Henry Lascelles Carr, journalist
18 October – Margaret Jones, travel writer (Y Gymraes o Ganaan), 60
17 November – Hugh Price Hughes, minister and anti-Parnell campaigner, 55
December – Thomas Davies, footballer, 36/37
date unknown – Jones Hewson, singer and actor, 27

References

Wales